"White Room" is a song by British rock band Cream, composed by bassist Jack Bruce with lyrics by poet Pete Brown. They recorded it for the studio half of the 1968 double album Wheels of Fire.  In September, a shorter US single edit (without the third verse) was released for AM radio stations, although album-oriented FM radio stations played the full album version. The subsequent UK single release in January 1969 used the full-length album version of the track.

Recording and composition
In 1967, at the initial session for Cream's third album (then still unnamed), recording for "White Room" reportedly began in London. In December, work continued at Atlantic Studios in New York City and was completed during three sessions in February, April and June 1968, also at Atlantic.

Jack Bruce sang and played bass on the song, Eric Clapton overdubbed guitar parts, Ginger Baker played drums and timpani, and Felix Pappalardi – the group's producer – contributed violas. Clapton played his guitar through a wah-wah pedal to achieve a "talking-effect". The song has an identical chord progression to Cream's previous recording "Tales of Brave Ulysses".

Recognition and other recordings

Rolling Stone magazine ranked "White Room" at number 376 on its list of the "500 Greatest Songs of All Time".  A live recording appears on the group's Live Cream Volume II album (1972). Clapton, along with Phil Collins, began his act at Live Aid in 1985 with the song. In 1990, Clapton performed the song at his Royal Albert Hall concert series and in 1999 with Sheryl Crow at Crow's Sheryl Crow and Friends: Live from Central Park concert. In 2005, the reunited Cream played the song at the Royal Albert Hall, which was released on their Royal Albert Hall London May 2-3-5-6, 2005 album.

In a song review for AllMusic, Stephen Thomas Erlewine noted that the song has been "covered frequently, and by a bizarre group of artists: Broadway star Joel Grey, the Finnish symphonic metal band Apocalyptica, fusion guitarist Frank Gambale, the Bluegrass-inspired Cache Valley Drifters, and heavy metal band Helloween. That wildly eclectic list proves that 'White Room' is a multi-faceted song, containing equal parts dramatic spectacle, intricate musicality, and hard rock menace. Other artists emphasize different elements in their interpretations, but the original Cream version wrapped it all up in one startling package".

Billboard described the single as a "solid, driving rocker."

Charts

Weekly charts

Year-end charts

Certifications

Deep Purple version
A version of the track was featured on Deep Purple's 2021 covers album Turning to Crime.

Personnel
Ian Gillan – lead and backing vocals
Roger Glover – bass
Ian Paice – drums
Steve Morse – guitar
Don Airey – keyboards

References

1968 singles
Cream (band) songs
Songs written by Jack Bruce
Number-one singles in Australia
Song recordings produced by Felix Pappalardi
Atco Records singles
Polydor Records singles
1968 songs
Songs with lyrics by Pete Brown